Wallace Telford John Murray  (11 September 1931 – 15 July 2004) was an Australian politician, elected as a member of the New South Wales Legislative Assembly.  He was a National Party  member for the seat of Barwon from 1 May 1976 until 3 March 1995.  He was Deputy Premier of New South Wales from 25 March 1988 until 26 May 1993.

Murray had originally decided to stay on as Deputy Premier and National Party leader until his retirement at the 1995 state election but was persuaded to retire from Cabinet and thus as Deputy Premier and National Party leader early in May 1993 by Liberal Premier John Fahey due to Fahey's desire to reshuffle his Cabinet.

References

 

1931 births
2004 deaths
Members of the New South Wales Legislative Assembly
National Party of Australia members of the Parliament of New South Wales
Deputy Premiers of New South Wales
Officers of the Order of Australia
People educated at Scots College (Sydney)
20th-century Australian politicians